Dexamethasone acetate is a synthetic glucocorticoid corticosteroid and a corticosteroid ester.

In China, 999 sells it under the brand name Pi Yan Ping.

References

Corticosteroid esters
Glucocorticoids